John Creighton was an Irish politician and soldier.
Creighton was born in County Fermanagh and educated at  Trinity College, Dublin. He represented  Armagh County from 1797 to 1800 when he became Governor of Hurst Castle.

References

People from County Fermanagh
Governors of Hurst Castle
Irish MPs 1790–1797
Irish MPs 1798–1800
Members of the Parliament of Ireland (pre-1801) for County Donegal constituencies
Alumni of Trinity College Dublin
British Army officers